William Azanor (born 28 June 1959) is a Nigerian boxer. He competed in the men's featherweight event at the 1980 Summer Olympics.

References

1959 births
Living people
Nigerian male boxers
Olympic boxers of Nigeria
Boxers at the 1980 Summer Olympics
Place of birth missing (living people)
Featherweight boxers